PWE can refer to:
Pete Waterman Entertainment, a British record label
Plane wave expansion method, an analytical procedure used in physics
Political Warfare Executive, World War II British propaganda organization
Protestant work ethic (sometimes referred to as Puritan work ethic), a social concept first referred to in the works of sociologist Max Weber
 Pevek Airport in Russia (IATA code)
 Penn West Energy Trust (New York Stock Exchange ticker symbol)
 Perfect World Entertainment, a video game publisher
 Pseudo-wire emulation, emulation of a point-to-point connection over a packet-switched network
 Yoshimi P-We, musician